The boys' rings competition at the 2018 Summer Youth Olympics was held at the America Pavilion on 14 October.

Qualification

Final

References

External links
Qualification results 
Final results 

Boys' rings